A Thing of Beauty is a novel by author A. J. Cronin, initially published in 1956, with the alternate title of Crusader's Tomb. It tells the story of Stephen Desmonde, an English painter who struggles for recognition in a conventional world, sacrificing everything for his passion for art.  The title is a reference to John Keats' 1818 poem, Endymion, which begins with "A thing of beauty is a joy for ever."

1956 British novels
Novels by A. J. Cronin
Novels about artists
Victor Gollancz Ltd books
Little, Brown and Company books